Johnny McGonigle (born 14 September 1944) is a British boxer. He competed in the men's flyweight event at the 1968 Summer Olympics. At the 1968 Summer Olympics, he lost to Tetsuaki Nakamura of Japan.

He won the 1968 Amateur Boxing Association British flyweight title, when boxing for the Army BC.

References

External links
 

1944 births
Living people
British male boxers
Olympic boxers of Great Britain
Boxers at the 1968 Summer Olympics
Sportspeople from Motherwell
Flyweight boxers